The 1988–89 Minnesota Golden Gophers men's basketball team represented the University of Minnesota during the 1988–89 NCAA Division I men's basketball season. Led by third-year head coach Clem Haskins, the Golden Gophers advanced to the Sweet 16 of the NCAA tournament and finished with a 19–12 record (9–9 Big Ten).

Roster

Schedule and results

|-
!colspan=9 style=| Non-conference regular season
|-

|-
!colspan=9 style=| Big Ten regular season

|-
!colspan=9 style=| NCAA Tournament

Rankings

References

Minnesota Golden Gophers men's basketball seasons
Minnesota
Minnesota
1988 in sports in Minnesota
1989 in sports in Minnesota